The Juneau Empire is a newspaper in Juneau, Alaska, United States.

It was founded on November 2, 1912, as the Alaska Daily Empire. In 1969 Morris Communications bought the newspaper. Mark Bryan was appointed publisher in 2009, but left the paper in 2013. In June of that year, Rustan Burton was named the new publisher and continues to run the paper today. In 2017, Morris Communications sold its newspapers to GateHouse Media. In 2018, GateHouse sold its Alaska papers to Sound Publications.

The Juneau Empire publishes daily except Monday and Saturday.

References

External links

 
 Morris subsidiary profile of the Juneau Empire 

1912 establishments in Alaska
Daily newspapers published in the United States
Mass media in Juneau, Alaska
Morris Publishing Group
Newspapers published in Alaska
Newspapers established in 1912

/redirected from juneuempire020.gov)